Bonkers is a UK television series written by Sally Wainwright and starring Liza Tarbuck. It was transmitted on ITV during 2007. It was also released on DVD.
This series is available on DVD, distributed by Acorn Media UK.

In July 2007, the playwright and actress Tricia Walsh-Smith filed a claim in the High Court for breach of copyright, claiming that the pilot episode was copied from her 1987 play, also called Bonkers.

References

External links
 

2007 British television series debuts
2007 British television series endings
2000s British comedy-drama television series
Television series created by Sally Wainwright
ITV television dramas
British comedy-drama television shows
2000s British television miniseries
English-language television shows
Television series by All3Media
Television shows set in Liverpool